"Finders Keepers, Losers Weepers" is a song written by Dory and Ollie Jones and recorded by Elvis Presley on May 26, 1963.  The song was first released in 1965 on the album, Elvis for Everyone.

References

1965 singles
Elvis Presley songs
1965 songs
Songs written by Ollie Jones (songwriter)